Li Xiao  is a Chinese football forward who played for China in the 1992 Asian Cup. He also played for Shanghai.

Career statistics

International statistics

External links
Team China Stats

1967 births
Living people
Chinese footballers
Chinese football managers
Shanghai Shenhua F.C. players
Wuhan Guanggu players
China international footballers
Footballers from Shanghai
1992 AFC Asian Cup players
Shanghai Shenxin F.C. managers
Asian Games silver medalists for China
Medalists at the 1994 Asian Games
Asian Games medalists in football
Association football forwards
Wuhan F.C. managers
Footballers at the 1994 Asian Games